NGC 451 is a spiral galaxy located in the constellation Pisces. It was discovered in 1881 by Édouard Stephan.

References

External links 
 

Galaxies discovered in 1881
Pisces
0451
4594
IC objects
Discoveries by Édouard Stephan
Spiral galaxies